Michael Spindler (22 December 1942 – September 5, 2016) was a German businessman who was president and CEO of Apple from 1993 to 1996. Spindler was born in Berlin.

Personal life
From 1985 until his death in 2016, Spindler lived between Paris, France, and San Francisco, California, United States, with his wife Maryse and three kids Karen, Laurie, and John.

Career
Spindler graduated from engineering at Technical University in Cologne in 1964 and worked at DEC and Intel, before he moved to join Apple Computer. Having joined Apple in 1980 after Mike Markkula brought him over to help out with Apple's European office; he rose through the ranks in Apple's European operations as President of Apple Europe, then President of Apple International. Michael Spindler had built a reputation as a great strategist in business tactics. One of his most successful strategies that soared Apple's global sales included giving Apple's various territories more autonomy over their marketing strategies. In January of 1990, then CEO of Apple, John Sculley, appointed Spindler to be Apple's chief operating officer. He was nicknamed "The Diesel" due to his strong work ethic.

On October 15, 1993, Spindler was chosen to take over as Apple's CEO when John Sculley was ousted by the board of directors. Spindler presided over several successful projects, such as the introduction of the PowerPC, as well as some major failures, including the Newton and the Copland operating system. Spindler shied away from the spotlight preferring instead to work on operational management and strategy without fanfare. After Spindler became CEO, he did not make a public appearance for four months. One of his first moves as CEO included massive cost cutting measures such as laying off workers, ending costly projects and cutting down on R&D projects, freezing executive salaries.  During his tenure the Apple board authorized merger discussions with IBM, Sun Microsystems and Philips, but when these went nowhere, he was replaced by Gil Amelio on February 2, 1996.

Death
Spindler died after a short illness on September 5, 2016. His longtime friend and business partner Jean-Louis Gassée stated, "Mike was an original, highly cultured mind, with high-level geopolitical views of our industry."

References

External links
Michael Spindler: The Peter Principle at Apple by Tom Hormby, April 6, 2006

1942 births
2017 deaths
American computer businesspeople
Apple Inc. executives
German emigrants to the United States
People from Berlin
Directors of Apple Inc.
20th-century American businesspeople